

The Armstrong Whitworth AW.171 was a British project of the 1950s to develop a supersonic VTOL flying wing aircraft. It was planned to investigate the extremely low aspect ratio delta wings proposed by Professor A.A. Griffith for supersonic transports. The A.W.171 design was a very slender delta flying wing powered by two Bristol Orpheus turbojets mounted at the wingtips, with 10 Rolls-Royce RB.108 lift jets. The pilot was to lie in a prone position to minimise drag. Work was cancelled in 1957 before a prototype was completed.

Specification

See also

References

Williams, Ray. "Paper Planes:Armstrong Whitworth's unbuilt projects". Air Enthusiast, Forty-three, 1991. ISSN 0143-5450. pp. 60–79.

External links
 Armstrong Whitworth AW.171

1950s British experimental aircraft
AW.171
Flying wings
VTOL aircraft
Cancelled aircraft projects
Prone pilot aircraft
Tailless delta-wing aircraft
Twinjets
Aircraft with auxiliary jet engines